Rang Sagar Lake (Hindi: रंग सागर) is situated in the city of Udaipur in the Rajasthan state of India. It is an artificially created lake, built in 1668.  It is also known as Amarkunt, that connects Swaroop Sagar Lake and Pichola Lake. It is situated Ambamata connecting to Swaroop Sagar lake.

See also
 List of lakes in India
 Udaipur

References 

Reservoirs in Rajasthan
Lakes of Udaipur
Tourist attractions in Udaipur